ConceptDraw MINDMAP is proprietary mind mapping and brainstorming software developed by CS Odessa for Microsoft Windows  and Apple macOS operating systems.

The mind mapping technology of visual thinking was invented by Tony Buzan in the 1960s.
Along with the traditional practice of hand-drawn mind maps there is a range of special mind mapping software, which is commonly used to create mind maps for purposes of business, project management and knowledge management.
The first version of ConceptDraw MINDMAP was released in 2001. Since 2008 it has been a part of the ConceptDraw OFFICE software package for Windows and macOS platform.

File formats 
 CDMZ - ConceptDraw MINDMAP document
 CDMM - ConceptDraw MINDMAP v5 and earlier document
 CDMTZ - ConceptDraw MINDMAP template

Cross-Platform Compatibility 
ConceptDraw MINDMAP is cross-platform compatible when running on macOS and Windows operating systems: files created on a computer power by macOS can be opened and edited on a Windows computer, and vice versa. The Developer's end-user license agreement allows for cross-platform installation with a single license.

Export/Import 
Using a standard file format allows interchange of files between: mind maps, project files and diagrams. 
ConceptDraw MINDMAP can import OPML files, text outlines, MS Project, MS Word and MS PowerPoint files, along with some mind mapping formats, such as  MindManager, XMind and FreeMind.
Export options include MS Project, MS Word, MS PowerPoint and MindManager as well, and also Adobe PDF, HTML, and a variety of graphics formats.
Through the set of plug-ins ConceptDraw MINDMAP is compatible with Twitter and Evernote services. Since the release of version 9, it is also compatible with Outlook and OneNote from Microsoft.

See also 

 Brainstorming
 Concept map
 Mind map
 Radial tree
 List of concept- and mind-mapping software
 List of educational software

References

External links 
 Tony Buzan Mind Mapping Tutorial
 World Mind Mapping Conference
 Mind Mapping Experts List

Office suites for Windows
Office suites for macOS
Mind-mapping software